is a Japanese actress and singer. She is best known internationally for her role in the 2021 film Drive My Car as well as her work on the soundtrack of the 2019 animated film Weathering with You. Miura collaborated with the band Radwimps on said soundtrack and most notably made the song "Grand Escape (グランドエスケープ)," which peaked at 9 on the  Billboard Japan Hot 100.

Filmography

Film

Television

References

External links
 Tōko Miura Official Website 
 

1996 births
Living people
21st-century Japanese actresses
21st-century Japanese women singers
People from Sapporo
Actors from Hokkaido